USS F-2 (SS-21) was an F-class submarine built for the United States Navy during the 1910s.

Description
They displaced  on the surface and  submerged. The F-class submarines had a crew of 1 officer and 21 enlisted men.

For surface running, the boats were powered by two  NELSECO diesel engines, each driving one propeller shaft. When submerged each propeller was driven by a  electric motor. They could reach  on the surface and  underwater.

The F-class submarines were armed with four 18-inch (450 mm) torpedo tubes in the bow, no reloads were carried.

Construction and career
The boat was named Barracuda when she was laid down by Union Iron Works of San Francisco, California, but was renamed on 17 November 1911.  She was launched on 19 March 1912 sponsored by Miss A. R. Rolph, daughter of James Rolph, the mayor of San Francisco, and commissioned on 25 June 1912.

F-2 joined the 1st Submarine Group, Pacific Torpedo Flotilla, in operations between San Diego, California, and San Pedro, Los Angeles out of San Pedro Submarine Base, the Flotilla's base. She continued to play an important part in developing tactics and coordinating the use of undersea craft with the fleet during an extended training period in the Hawaiian Islands's Naval Submarine Base Pearl Harbor from August 1914-November 1915.

After lying in ordinary at Mare Island Naval Shipyard from 16 March 1916 – 13 June 1917, F-2 became flagship of Division 1, Submarine Force, Pacific Fleet. Returning to operations out of San Pedro, she participated in surface and submerged exercises, torpedo-proving practice, experiments in balancing at various depths, and trained prospective crews of new submarines. On 18 September 1919, she was placed in reserve commission at San Pedro to be used in elemental school work until decommissioned at Mare Island on 16 March 1922. She was sold on 17 August.

Notes

References

External links

F-2
World War I submarines of the United States
Ships built in San Francisco
1912 ships
Ships built by Union Iron Works